Fayette County May refer to one of several counties in the United States, each named for the Marquis de Lafayette, a Frenchman who served in the American Revolution:

Fayette County, Alabama
Fayette County, Georgia
Fayette County, Illinois
Fayette County, Indiana
Fayette County, Iowa
Fayette County, Kentucky
Fayette County, Ohio
Fayette County, Pennsylvania
Fayette County, Tennessee
Fayette County, Texas
Fayette County, Virginia, has existed twice; the two counties continue in existence as Fayette County, Kentucky and Fayette County, West Virginia
Fayette County, West Virginia

See also 
 Lafayette County (disambiguation)